The Utah Utes men's lacrosse team represents the University of Utah in National Collegiate Athletic Association (NCAA) Division I college lacrosse. The program was upgraded to varsity in 2019, previously competing as a club team in the Men's Collegiate Lacrosse Association (MCLA). The Utes are one of four current NCAA Division I men's lacrosse teams west of the Mississippi River, along with  Air Force, Denver, and Lindenwood. Utah plays its home games at the Ute Soccer Field, which has a capacity of 2,500. The Utes competed as an independent from their inaugural season of play in 2019 until joining the ASUN Conference as a single-sport member after the 2021 season. Through 2022, the team has an all–time record of 22-24.

The westernmost team in NCAA Division I men's lacrosse by 400 miles, Utah played its first varsity game against Vermont, losing 21–6. Jimmy Perkins scored the program's first goal in front of 3,215 fans in Utah Football's Rice–Eccles Stadium. Led by seven goals by Josh Stout in the following game, the Utes secured their first win in program history, defeating the Mercer Bears 13–9 in Salt Lake City.

Season results
The following is a list of Utah's results by season as an NCAA Division I program:

{| class="wikitable"

|- align="center"

†NCAA canceled 2020 collegiate activities due to COVID-19.

References

External links
Official website

 
College men's lacrosse teams in the United States
ASUN Conference men's lacrosse